The Nek Cemetery is a small Commonwealth War Graves Commission cemetery located near Suvla Bay on the Gallipoli Peninsula in Turkey.

The cemetery was constructed following the Armistice in 1919 on the site of the Battle of the Nek, at which time the ground was still covered with the remains of Australian 8th and 10th Light Horse troopers killed in the battle four years previously. It is likely that they form the majority of the unknown graves in the cemetery.  The cemetery has the graves of only five identified soldiers and special memorials to another five known to be buried there.

References

External links

 
 

Commonwealth War Graves Commission cemeteries in Gallipoli